= Ali Muhammad Mihar Halt railway station =

Railway station in Pakistan

Ali Muhammad Mihar Halt railway station علي محمد مهر هالٽ ريلوي اسٽيشن علی محمد مہر ہالٹ ریلوے اسٹیشن

General information
- Owner: Ministry of Railways

Other information
- Station code: AMMR

Ali Muhammad Mihar Halt railway station (Urdu: علی محمد مہر ہالٹ ریلوے اسٹیشن, Sindhi: علي محمد مهر هالٽ ريلوي اسٽيشن) is located in Pakistan.

== See also ==
- List of railway stations in Pakistan
- Pakistan Railways
